Garidepally mandal is one of the 23 mandals in Suryapet district in the Indian state of Telangana. It is under the administration of the Suryapet revenue division, with its headquarters at Garidepally. It is bounded by  Neredcherla mandal to the west, Huzurnagar mandal to the east, Penpahad mandal to the north, and Mattampally mandal to the south.

Geography

Demographics
Garidepally mandal is having a population of 54,515 living in 13,066 Houses. Males are 27,708 and Females are 26,807. Kuthubshapur is the smallest Village and Garidepally is the biggest Village .

Villages 
At the 2011 census of India, the mandal had 13 settlements:

Notes
(†) Mandal headquarter

References

Mandals in Suryapet district